Massimo Venturiello (born 4 August 1957) is an Italian actor and voice actor.

Biography
Born in Roccadaspide, Province of Salerno, in 1982 Venturiello graduated at the Silvio D'Amico Academy of dramatic Arts in Rome and the same year he made his stage debut in an adaptation of William Shakespeare's Titus Andronicus directed by Gabriele Lavia. From then, he started an intense theatrical activity, which includes experimental and avant-garde works and a long collaboration with the director Giampiero Solari. Also active in films and on television, he is well known for the role of Rudy in Gabriele Salvatores' Marrakech Express.

As a voice actor, Venturiello performed the Italian voice of Gary Oldman as Sirius Black in his first three appearances in the Harry Potter film franchise and as Commissioner James Gordon in Batman Begins. In his animated roles, he dubbed Hades VS Dr. Phillium Benedict in the 1997-2001 film Hercules and Recess: School's Out.

Filmography

Cinema
My First Forty Years (1987)
Good Morning, Babylon (1987)
The Strangeness of Life (1987)
Marrakech Express (1991)
The Wicked (1991)
Vietato ai minori (1992)

Television
Distretto di Polizia 6 (2006)
Our Land (2007)
Il Capo dei Capi (2007)
Intelligence – Servizi & segreti (2009)
Il peccato e la vergogna (2010)

Dubbing roles

Animation
Hades in Hercules
Hades in Hercules: Zero to Hero
Hades in Hercules: The Animated Series 
Hades in Disney's House of Mouse
Benedict in Recess: School's Out
C-3PO in Star Wars: Droids

Live action
Sirius Black in Harry Potter and the Prisoner of Azkaban
Sirius Black in Harry Potter and the Goblet of Fire
Sirius Black in Harry Potter and the Order of the Phoenix
James Gordon in Batman Begins
Father Solomon in Red Riding Hood
Nicholas Wyatt in Paranoia
KITT in Knight Rider (seasons 2-4)
Lester Diamond in Casino
Byron De La Beckwith in Ghosts of Mississippi
Father John Fielding in The Mission
Jean Valjean in Les Misérables
Snake Plissken in Escape from L.A.
Jackie Elliot in Billy Elliot
Bowen in Dragonheart
Richard Chance in To Live and Die in L.A.
Kevin in Gloria
The Jackal in The Jackal
George Emerson in A Room with a View

References

External links 
 
 

1957 births
Living people
People from the Province of Salerno
20th-century Italian male actors
21st-century Italian male actors
Italian male film actors
Italian male voice actors
Italian male television actors
Italian male stage actors
Italian theatre directors
Accademia Nazionale di Arte Drammatica Silvio D'Amico alumni